Poluvsie is a village and municipality in Prievidza District in the Trenčín Region of western Slovakia.

History
In historical records, the village was first mentioned in 1358.

Poluvsie (then known by its Hungarian name Erdoret) was the birthplace of Josef Gabčík (1912-1942), a participant in The assassination of Reinhard Heydrich.

Geography
The municipality lies at an altitude of 320 metres and covers an area of 2.165 km2. It has a population of about 562 people.

References

External links
 
 
http://www.statistics.sk/mosmis/eng/run.html
http://www.poluvsiehokej.host.sk/

Villages and municipalities in Prievidza District